P85 may refer to:
 , a fast attack craft of the Argentine Navy
 , a patrol boat of the Royal Australian Navy
 McDonnell XP-85, an American prototype fighter aircraft
 Papyrus 85, a biblical manuscript
 PIK3R2, phosphatidylinositol 3-kinase regulatory subunit beta
 Ruger P85, a pistol
 Tesla Model S P85, an American automobile
 Yamaha P-85, a digital piano
 P85, a state regional road in Latvia